Néstor William Otero Carvajal (born 18 September 1955) is a Colombian football manager.

Career
Born in Cali, Otero studied mathematics at Universidad Santiago de Cali, earning him the nickname Matemático. Otero began his football coaching career with Deportes Tolima in 1999. In eighteen years managing Colombian professional football clubs, Otero has worked for a total of twelve teams (including two spells each at Deportivo Cali and Deportivo Pasto).

Otero has led two clubs to runner's-up finishes in the Categoría Primera A (Pasto in 2002 and Atlético Huila in 2007).

References

1955 births
Living people
Sportspeople from Cali
Colombian football managers
Categoría Primera A managers
Deportes Tolima managers
Deportivo Cali managers
Deportivo Pasto managers
Deportivo Pereira managers
Real Cartagena managers
Atlético Huila managers
Deportes Quindío managers
Cúcuta Deportivo managers
Independiente Santa Fe managers
La Equidad managers
Colombian expatriate football managers
Expatriate football managers in Peru
Colombian expatriate sportspeople in Peru
Águilas Doradas Rionegro managers